The 1954 Chicago White Sox season was the team's 54th season in the major leagues, and its 55th season overall. They finished with a record of 94–60, good enough for third place in the American League, 17 games behind the first place Cleveland Indians.

Offseason 
 November 30, 1953: Al Sima was drafted by the White Sox from the Washington Senators in the 1953 rule 5 draft.
 November 30, 1953: Carl Sawatski was selected off waivers by the White Sox from the Chicago Cubs.
 February 5, 1954: Neil Berry and Sam Mele were traded by the White Sox to the Baltimore Orioles for Johnny Groth and Johnny Lipon.

Regular season

Season standings

Record vs. opponents

Opening Day lineup 
 Chico Carrasquel, SS
 Nellie Fox, 2B
 Bob Boyd, LF
 Minnie Miñoso, 3B
 Ferris Fain, 1B
 Sherm Lollar, C
 Jim Rivera, RF
 Johnny Groth, CF
 Billy Pierce, P

Notable transactions 
 June 11, 1954: Sonny Dixon, Al Sima, Bill Wilson, and $20,000 was traded by the White Sox to the Philadelphia Athletics for Morrie Martin and Ed McGhee.

Roster

Player stats

Batting 
Note: G = Games played; AB = At bats; R = Runs scored; H = Hits; 2B = Doubles; 3B = Triples; HR = Home runs; RBI = Runs batted in; BB = Base on balls; SO = Strikeouts; AVG = Batting average; SB = Stolen bases

Pitching 
Note: W = Wins; L = Losses; ERA = Earned run average; G = Games pitched; GS = Games started; SV = Saves; IP = Innings pitched; H = Hits allowed; R = Runs allowed; ER = Earned runs allowed; HR = Home runs allowed; BB = Walks allowed; K = Strikeouts

Farm system

Notes

References 
 1954 Chicago White Sox at Baseball Reference

Chicago White Sox seasons
Chicago White Sox season
Chicago White